Leptomischus is a genus of plants in the family Rubiaceae, native to southern China and southeast Asia.

Species
, Plants of the World Online recognises the following species:
Leptomischus erianthus H.S.Lo – Yunnan
Leptomischus flaviflorus Hareesh, L.Wu & M.Sabu – Arunachal Pradesh
Leptomischus funingensis H.S.Lo – Yunnan
Leptomischus guangxiensis H.S.Lo – Guangxi
Leptomischus hiepii L.Wu, K.S.Nguyen & Aver. – Vietnam
Leptomischus parviflorus H.S.Lo – Yunnan, Vietnam, Hainan
Leptomischus primuloides Drake – Yunnan, Vietnam, Myanmar
Leptomischus wallichii (Hook.f.) H.S.Lo – Assam

References

Rubiaceae genera